Moloko Maggie Tlou (died 3 February 2022) was a South African politician who served as a Member of Parliament (MP) for the African National Congress from May 2019 until her death in February 2022.

During her time in parliament, she was a member of the Portfolio Committee on Cooperative Governance and Traditional Affairs.

Death
Tlou died on 3 February 2022.

References 

20th-century births
2022 deaths
Members of the National Assembly of South Africa
Women members of the National Assembly of South Africa
African National Congress politicians
21st-century South African women politicians
21st-century South African politicians
Year of birth missing
People from Gauteng